Aorangaia Island is an island in the Northland Region of New Zealand, part of the Poor Knights Islands.

See also

 List of islands of New Zealand
 List of islands
 Desert island

References

Uninhabited islands of New Zealand
Whangarei District
Islands of the Northland Region